Fabián Slančík (born 22 September 1991) is a Slovak football forward who currently plays for FK Slovenske Darmoty.

References

External links

1991 births
Living people
Slovak footballers
Association football forwards
MŠK Novohrad Lučenec players
FK Dukla Banská Bystrica players
FC Zbrojovka Brno players
Spartak Myjava players
FC ViOn Zlaté Moravce players
Slovak Super Liga players
Czech First League players
Expatriate footballers in the Czech Republic
People from Veľký Krtíš
Sportspeople from the Banská Bystrica Region